Charles Fisher, born Charles Fish,  was an American professional baseball player. He played in one game on June 15, 1889 for the Louisville Colonels of the American Association. A local semi-pro player, he served as a replacement player when several members of the Colonels refused to play in protest of owner Mordecai Davidson's failure to pay them.

References

External links

Major League Baseball outfielders
Louisville Colonels players
Baseball players from Baltimore
19th-century baseball players